Norman H. Joyner was an American politician.

After graduating from Wake Forest University in 1948, Joyner earned a bachelor's of divinity from Southern Baptist Theological Seminary. Between 1966 and 1968, Joyner was a member of the Iredell County board of commissioners. By 1969, he had been elected to the North Carolina Senate. While serving as a state senator, Joyner was selected to attend the 1972 National Forum of State Legislators on Older Americans, and contested the Republican Party primary held for the lieutenant gubernatorial election that year.

References

Year of birth missing
Year of death missing
20th-century American politicians
Republican Party North Carolina state senators
Wake Forest University alumni
Southern Baptist Theological Seminary alumni
20th-century Baptist ministers from the United States
Baptists from North Carolina
County commissioners in North Carolina